John C. Gunn may refer to:

John Currie Gunn (1916-2002), Scottish scientist
John C. Gunn, writer on the subject of the Popular Health Movement